Five vessels named HMS Cracker have served the Royal Navy. A sixth was ordered but the order was cancelled.

She was sold in 1802.
 was a later Archer-class gun brig, launched in 1804. She participated in several actions and captured two small French privateers. She was sold for breaking up in 1816.
 was a cutter purchased at Cowes and sold in November 1842.
Cracker was a schooner ordered in 1846 from the Deptford Dockyard. The order was cancelled on 1850.
 was a wood, screw  launched by Pitcher, Northfleet. She was sold for breaking up in April 1864.
 was a composite screw gunboat launched at Portsmouth. She was broken u there in 1889.

Royal Navy ship names